The 2021 Quaife Mini Challenge season was the twentieth season of the Mini Challenge UK. The season began on 12 March at Snetterton and ended on 24 October at Brands Hatch. It included nineteen rounds across the UK, all the JCW Class races and 2 of the Cooper Class races support the British Touring Car Championship.

Entry list
All drivers raced under British licences.

Results

JCW Class

Championship standings
Scoring system
Championship points were awarded for the all finishing positions in each Championship Race. Entries were required to complete 75% of the winning car's race distance in order to be classified and earn points. There were bonus points awarded for Pole Position and Fastest Lap.

Championship Race points

Drivers' Championship

JCW Class